Launders is a surname. Notable people with the surname include:

 Brian Launders (born 1976), Irish footballer
 Jimmy Launders (1919–1988), British Royal Navy officer

See also
 Landers (surname)
 Launder (surname)